Chabanais is a commune in the Charente department in southwestern France.

Geography

The river Vienne passes through Chabanais. The village is located in the Rochechouart impact structure. The ancient asteroid impact crater associated with it has eroded away and is no longer visible. Located in the heart of the Charente, Chabanais is 42 km west of Limoges, 50 km northeast of Angoulême, 77 km north of Périgueux and 84 km southeast of Poitiers.

The town is small enough to be considered a large village and it boasts an open-air market every Thursday, adding to a number of small, privately owned shops. The town has a rail station connecting with Limoges to the east and Angoulême to the west.

History

Chabanais was struck by an F2 tornado on 5 May 1997. In the summer of 2018, the town centre and some surrounding hamlets were struck by a devastating hailstorm which punctured many roofs on buildings and destroyed hundreds of car windscreens and bodywork.

Population

See also
Communes of the Charente department

References

Communes of Charente
Charente communes articles needing translation from French Wikipedia